The  is a handheld game console released by Epoch Co. in March 1991.

The console at retail was supplied with a number of cards, each of which had a barcode. Upon starting the game, the player must swipe a barcode representing a player. The game uses barcodes to create a character for the player to use. Not all barcodes work as players; instead some represent enemies or powerups. Because of the ubiquity of barcodes in daily life, players were encouraged to go beyond the barcodes provided with the game itself and to experiment to find their own barcode monsters and powerups from everyday products like food and cleaning products.

Once the game itself is started, the characters "battle" against each other. The characters' statistics were applied to an algorithm containing a random number generator to determine the outcome of each round in the fight.

History
The original Barcode Battler was released by Epoch in Japan only. It was identical in shape to the worldwide released Barcode Battler and had a white case.

Battles on this machine are much more simplistic than its successor, with support only for "Soldiers" (renamed in the worldwide release as "Warriors"), and infinite Survival points.

In 1992, a successor unit called the Barcode Battler II (see below) was released worldwide, featuring interface capabilities with the Famicom and Super Famicom.

Popularity
The Barcode Battler was very popular in Japan—the idea of experimenting with and collecting barcodes to find out what they would equate to in the gaming world fired the imaginations of many people.

Outside Japan, it was a massive flop; it was hyped up, and sold in shops alongside the Game Boy, and the Game Gear, to which it bore some superficial similarities. By comparison, the gameplay of the Barcode Battler was repetitive and featured no graphics, sound effects or controls, and it was quickly forgotten by the general gaming public.

However, the release of devices such as Nintendo's e-Reader, as well as barcode games in arcades in the UK such as Dinosaur King and Love and Berry, has shown that there is now an interest in the market. The Barcode Battler grew in popularity in Japan so much that special edition cards were created. These cards were characters from Super Mario, The Legend of Zelda, and many others. They had their own barcodes and unique stats and powers. Nintendo-licensed special edition cards were produced for both the Mario series, and The Legend of Zelda series. Other special edition versions were commissioned by Falcom (for Lord Monarch/Dragon Slayer) and NTV (for the Doraemon series).

Barcode Battler II

It featured an extended single player mode, a wider variety of game elements, and an output port designed with interface capabilities - a feature that Nintendo took advantage of in licensing the Barcode Battler II Interface unit. The BBII Interface allowed the Barcode Battler to be attached to the Famicom and Super Famicom (via an adapter) consoles similar to the way the Game Boy Player allows for interfacing of the Nintendo GameCube with the e-Reader. The functionality of the Barcode Battler II while on this connection was purely as a barcode reader and the gameplay depended on the game cartridge in the machine it was connected to.

Some time in 1992/1993, Epoch released the Barcode Battler II across the world, under the name of Barcode Battler. Essentially, the worldwide release differed from the Japanese model in only the design of the LCD screen — it had an English interface instead of a Japanese one. It still had the output port, but no games support it outside of Japanese releases. Also, the artwork on the manuals and barcode cards differed to suit the Western gaming audience.

Interfaced games
Due to the professional relationship between Epoch Co. and Nintendo, Epoch designed a number of games for the Famicom and Super Famicom that required the use of the Barcode Battler II and BBII Interface to play or to enjoy enhanced functions. These games included:
 (NES, 1992)
 (SNES, 1993)
 (SNES, 1993)
 (SNES 1993)
 (SNES 1993)
 (SNES, 1994)
 (SNES, 1994)
 (SNES, 1994)
 (SNES, 1995)
 (SNES, 1995)
 (SNES, 1995)
 (SNES, 1995)

Manga
A manga was produced to promote the Barcode Battler, called "Barcode Fighter". Five volumes were produced between April 1992 and June 1994, and were later reprinted into two volumes.

See also
 List of barcode games
 Epoch Game Pocket Computer
 Nintendo e-Reader
 Digimon Frontier
 Skannerz

Notes

References

External links

1991 video games
Handheld game consoles
Products introduced in 1991
Video games developed in Japan
Video games using barcodes
Comics based on toys